Dale L. Baer (June 15, 1950 – January 15, 2021) was an American character animator for Walt Disney Animation Studios and The Baer Animation Company. He was supervising animator of many characters.

Biography
Baer had over 40 years of experience in the animation industry. He also had 27 years in the commercial field. Baer's studio specialized in traditional and digital animation which is used in feature animation and commercials. Baer collaborated with top industries to produce high quality animated productions. He joined The Walt Disney Company in 1970 as the second member of the new training program; Ted Kierscey, who later became an effects animator, got there ahead of him. Mr. Baer earned the respect of animators from the Nine Old Men Eric Larson, John Lounsbery, Milt Kahl, Wolfgang Reitherman, and Frank Thomas & Ollie Johnston.

Baer taught as part of the Character Animation program faculty of CalArts School of Film/Video.

His last-known animation work was for The Bob's Burgers Movie.

Baer died of complications from amyotrophic lateral sclerosis at Irvine Medical Center in Irvine, California.

Awards
Below is a list of awards Baer has won.
 2001 - Annie Award for Individual Character Animation for the character of Yzma in The Emperor's New Groove.
 2016 - Winsor McCay Award – in recognition of career contributions to the art of animation.

Filmography

References

External links

1950 births
2021 deaths
American animators
Artists from Denver
Walt Disney Animation Studios people
Neurological disease deaths in California
Deaths from motor neuron disease
Annie Award winners